The Brook Islands National Park is a national park in Cassowary Coast Region, Queensland, Australia, 1246 km northwest of Brisbane, with an area of 0.9 km2.  It was established in 1994 and comprises three islands (North, Tween and Middle) which lie off the coast 7 km north-east of Cape Richards on Hinchinbrook Island and 30 km east of the nearest mainland town of Cardwell. The fourth island of the Brooks group, South Island, is not part of the national park but is protected by the Great Barrier Reef Marine Park Authority.  Public access to the three islands in the national park is prohibited in order to protect breeding birds, especially the Torresian imperial-pigeon. The islands have no roads, walking tracks or other facilities.  Popular activities in the waters around the islands are boating, snorkelling and fishing.  The islands are managed by the Queensland Parks and Wildlife Service. The Park's IUCN category is II.

Fauna
Up to 60,000 pied imperial-pigeons breed on the islands during summer, providing a spectacle to onlookers as they return to their nests each evening after foraging for rainforest fruits in the mainland and Hinchinbrook Island.  Following regular illegal shooting of the birds there during the early and mid 20th Century, the population using the islands was subject to a long protection campaign and monitoring program by conservation activists Margaret and Arthur Thorsborne.  There are also breeding colonies of bridled, black-naped, little, lesser crested and roseate terns. Beach stone-curlews breed on North Island beaches.  The islands have been classified by BirdLife International as an Important Bird Area because of the global importance of the site for pied imperial-pigeons and lesser crested terns.

History
Brook Island, the largest in the group, was in 1944 the venue for a series of British and American tests on the military uses of mustard gas. A documentary film Keen as Mustard, relating to these and other tests, was released by Film Australia in 1989.

See also

 Protected areas of Queensland

References

External links
 Brook Islands National Park

National parks of Queensland
Islands of Queensland
Protected areas established in 1994
Important Bird Areas of Queensland
North Queensland
Islands of Far North Queensland